{{Infobox football club 
| clubname = Limoneros de Fútbol, A.C.
| image = LANCEROS.gif
| image_size = 150px
| fullname =Club Limoneros de Fútbol Asociación Civil
| nickname =  Limoneros
| founded = 2005
| disbanded = 
| ground = U Deportiva La Choca  , Cosoleacaque, Veracruz
| capacity = 	1,000 
| chairman =  Gudalupe Elvira Zamora | manager =  Mario Elvira| league = Tercera División de México
| season = Apertura 2011

| pattern_la1 = _thinblacklower
| pattern_b1  = _horizontalstripes2
| pattern_ra1 = _thinblacklower
| pattern_sh1 = _blacksides
| pattern_so1 = _blackstripe
| leftarm1    = ED2300
| body1       = ED2300
| rightarm1   = ED2300
| shorts1     = CD2300
| socks1      = ED2300

| pattern_la2 = _thinblacklower
| pattern_b2  = _horizontalstripes2
| pattern_ra2 = _thinblacklower
| pattern_sh2 = _blacksides
| pattern_so2 = _blackstripe
| leftarm2    = EFEFEF
| body2       = EFEFEF
| rightarm2   = EFEFEF
| shorts2     = EFEFEF
| socks2      = CDCDCD

| pattern_la3 = _thinblacklower
| pattern_b3  = _horizontalstripes2
| pattern_ra3 = _thinblacklower
| pattern_sh3 = _blacksides
| pattern_so3 = _blackstripe
| leftarm3    = 0099CC
| body3       = 0099CC
| rightarm3   = 0099CC
| shorts3     = 009900
| socks3      = 0099CC

}}Lanceros de Cosoleacaque''' is a Mexican football club that plays in the Tercera División de México. The club is based in  Lanceros de Cosoleacaque, Veracruz.

See also
Football in Mexico
Veracruz
Tercera División de México

References

External links
Official Page

Football clubs in Veracruz
2005 establishments in Mexico